The 2004 United States presidential election in Hawaii took place on November 2, 2004. Voters chose four representatives, or electors, to the Electoral College, who voted for president and vice president.

Hawaii was won by Democratic nominee John Kerry by an 8.7% margin of victory. Prior to the election, all 12 news organizations considered this a state Kerry would win, or otherwise considered as a safe blue state. The state has voted Republican only twice since statehood (in the 49-state Republican landslides of 1972 and 1984). As of the 2020 presidential election, this is the last time Hawaii was decided by a single-digit margin, the last time a Democratic candidate for president failed to receive 60% of the vote in Hawaii, and also the last time a Republican received more than 35% of the vote here.

Caucuses
2004 Hawaii Democratic caucuses

Campaign

Predictions
There were 12 news organizations who made state-by-state predictions of the election. Here are their last predictions before election day.

Polling
Only 4 pre-election polls were taken in the state in the entire 2004 election. Kerry won the first two, which were taken before October, and Bush won the other 2 which were taken in the final month of October. The final RCP average gave Bush leading with a margin of 0.9%. The final 3 polls averaged Kerry leading 48% to 43%.

Fundraising
Bush raised $906,799. Kerry raised $279,877.

Advertising and visits
Neither campaign spent advertising money during the fall campaign. However, with polls showing the race tightening, Vice President Cheney appeared at a campaign rally for the Republican ticket in Honolulu on October 31, 2004.

Analysis
Bush and Cheney did campaign here early on, but not throughout the entire campaign. Hawaii is considered too much of a Democratic stronghold to be a swing state. Hawaii is represented by two Democratic senators and representatives, and there has never been any competition in a senatorial election. Despite Bush's loss in the state, he improved upon his performance in the state from 2000. More importantly, he had the strongest showing for a Republican presidential candidate in the state since Ronald Reagan in 1984, doing a little better than his father did in 1988. This is the last time Hawaii was decided by a single digit margin. This is also the last time a Republican received more than 45% of the vote in Hawaii.

Results

By county

By congressional district
Kerry won both congressional districts.

Electors 

Technically the voters of Hawaii cast their ballots for electors: representatives to the Electoral College. Hawaii is allocated 4 electors because it has 2 congressional districts and 2 senators. All candidates who appear on the ballot or qualify to receive write-in votes must submit a list of 4 electors, who pledge to vote for their candidate and his or her running mate. Whoever wins the majority of votes in the state is awarded all 4 electoral votes. Their chosen electors then vote for president and vice president. Although electors are pledged to their candidate and running mate, they are not obligated to vote for them. An elector who votes for someone other than his or her candidate is known as a faithless elector.

The electors of each state and the District of Columbia met on December 13, 2004, to cast their votes for president and vice president. The Electoral College itself never meets as one body. Instead the electors from each state and the District of Columbia met in their respective capitols.

The following were the members of the Electoral College from Hawaii. All were pledged to and voted for John Kerry and John Edwards:

 Frances Kagawa
 Joy Kobashigawa Lewis
 Samuel Mitchell
 Dolly Strazar

References 

Hawaii
2004
2004 Hawaii elections